Riverside is an unincorporated, historic community in Clackamas County, Oregon, United States. It lies at an elevation of 292 feet (89 m).

References

Unincorporated communities in Clackamas County, Oregon
Unincorporated communities in Oregon